The Sucarnoochee River is a river in Kemper County, Mississippi and Sumter County, Alabama.

Sucarnoochee is a name derived from the Choctaw language purported to mean either (sources vary) "hog's river" or "place where hogs fatten".

See also
List of rivers of Alabama
List of rivers of Mississippi

References

Rivers of Alabama
Rivers of Mississippi
Bodies of water of Kemper County, Mississippi
Bodies of water of Sumter County, Alabama
Tributaries of the Tombigbee River
Mississippi placenames of Native American origin
Alabama placenames of Native American origin